= Premaku Jai =

Telugu language film

Premaku Jai(True Love Never Ends)
- Directed by: Srinivas Mallam
- Written by: Srinivas Mallam
- Produced by: T. Anasurya
- Starring: Anil Burugani; Jwalitha Ravuri; Bhaskar Dubbaka; Anand Bharathi; Jabardasth Saddam
- Cinematography: S Urukunda Reddy
- Edited by: Samrat Yadav
- Music by: Kotagiri Chaitu
- Release date: 11 April 2025
- Running time: 123 minutes
- Country: India
- Language: Telugu

Premaku Jai is a 2025 Telugu language film directed by Srinivas Mallam produced by T. Anasurya.Main lead is Anil Burugani, Jwalitha Ravuri, Bhaskar Dubbaka, Anand Bharathi and Jabardasth Saddam. Music scored by Kotagiri Chaitu.

== Plot ==
Premaku Jai follows the story of Jai (Anil Burugani), an ardent admirer of actor Chiranjeevi who aspires to become a film hero himself. Living in a rural village, Jai falls in love with Prema (Jwalitha Ravuri), a vibrant young woman from the same community. However, their budding romance faces strong opposition from Prema's father, who disapproves of their relationship.

Determined to prove his worth, Jai leaves for Hyderabad with the dream of making a name for himself in the film industry. He vows to return one day, successful and worthy of Prema's love. As the two young lovers endure their separation with hope and longing, an unexpected tragedy occurs—both Jai and Prema are found dead under mysterious circumstances.

The film delves into the unraveling of this tragedy, exploring the events that led to their deaths. As secrets unfold and tensions rise, Premaku Jai becomes a gripping tale of love, ambition, societal pressure, and the pursuit of justice.

== Cast ==
- Anil Burugani
- Jwalitha Ravuri
- Bhaskar Dubbaka
- Anand Bharathi
- Jabardasth Saddam

== Release ==
The film was released theatrically on 11 April 2025.

== Soundtrack ==
This film music compossed by Kotagiri Chaitu

== Critical reception ==
Sakshi post said Premaku Jai is a socially conscious drama that speaks truth to power. It’s a compelling watch for those who believe love should never be a death sentence.
